Closed-ended may refer to:

 Closed-end fund
 Closed-ended question

See also 
 Open-ended (disambiguation)